East hundred may refer to:
 East (Cornish hundred), Cornwall, England
 East Rutland, a hundred of Rutland, England
 East Hundred (band)